Herbert John Edwin Burrell (15 November 1866 – 22 May 1949) was an English cleric and cricketer. He played in first-class cricket games for Oxford University in 1889 and for Essex in 1895.

Life
The son of John Burrell of Kirtling, Cambridgeshire, Burrell was educated at Charterhouse School and matriculated at Magdalen College, Oxford in 1885. He graduated B.A. in 1889 and M.A. in 1892.

Burrell was ordained deacon in 1890, and priest of the Church of England in 1891. He then attended Cuddesdon Theological College. He was chaplain to John Festing, Bishop of St Albans, in 1894, and became vicar of Wigginton, Hertfordshire in 1899. He was rector of Balsham, Cambridgeshire, 1910–34. 

During the First World War Burrell was a secretary and orderly in Balsham Red Cross Hospital. 

His younger brother John also played first-class cricket.

Burrell became a Fellow of the Society of Antiquaries of London.

References

1866 births
1949 deaths
English cricketers
Essex cricketers
People from East Cambridgeshire District
Oxford University cricketers
Hertfordshire cricketers
People educated at Charterhouse School
Alumni of Magdalen College, Oxford
20th-century English Anglican priests
Fellows of the Society of Antiquaries of London
People from Balsham